Speech Buddies are a series of speech therapy tools to remediate articulation and speech sound disorders using the teaching method of tactile feedback. Articulation, or speech sound disorders occur when a person has difficulty producing a sound correctly. Sounds may be left off, substituted, added or changed, making it difficult to be understood.  Often occurring when children are learning to speak, these errors are considered a disorder if they persist after a certain developmental age. This is the age at which a child should be able to correctly produce a certain sound depending on the difficulty of the sound. The B-sound is one of the first mastered, while the R-sound is more difficult and may not be mastered until several years later.  Most articulation disorders are of no known cause, though many can be attributed to other disorders such as autism, or hearing impairment.

Speech Buddies help treat articulation disorders. There are five different Speech Buddies, each one addressing an individual sound: R, S, L, CH or SH. These tools teach correct tongue placement when trying to produce problem sounds. This type of learning is called tactile feedback, which uses the sense of touch to promote learning.

Preliminary research results from a single-blind randomized controlled trial suggest that they may increase the speed at which a child can learn to correct his speech sound disorder. Ongoing research is exploring the use of Speech Buddies to help in other speech therapy applications including foreign accent reduction, developmental verbal dyspraxia, acquired apraxia of speech from stroke or traumatic brain injury (TBI).  Experts have published clinical experiences using Speech Buddies for articulation disorders and apraxia in industry blogs such as Play on Words, Mommy Speech Therapy, and traditional publications such as the Chicago Tribune. On May 31, 2011, Dr. Max Gomez of WCBS-NY reported on how Speech Buddies are being used to reduce the overall cost and treatment time of speech therapy.

Speech Buddies were invented by Articulate Technologies, Inc., in San Francisco, CA. Speech Buddies® and Speech Buddy™ are trademarks of Articulate Technologies, Inc. They are FDA listed medical devices.

References

External links 
 www.speechbuddy.com

Speech and language pathology
Special education